Henry Vernon may refer to:

Henry Vernon (died 1515) (1441–1515), Tudor courtier, MP for Derbyshire
Henry Vernon (died 1569) (1523–1569), MP for Lichfield and Derbyshire
Henry Vernon (cricketer) (1828–1855), English cricketer
Sir Henry Vernon, 1st Baronet (1605–1676)
Henry Vernon (1686–1719), English MP for Staffordshire and Newcastle-under-Lyme
Henry Vernon (1663–1732), English MP for Stafford
Henry Vernon (1718–1765), English MP for Lichfield and Newcastle-under-Lyme

See also
Henry Venables-Vernon, 3rd Baron Vernon (1747–1829), Baron Vernon